El Pípila is the nickname of a local hero of the city of Guanajuato in Mexico. His real name was Juan José de los Reyes Martínez Amaro (1782–1863), son of Pedro Martínez and María Rufina Amaro. He married a woman named Maria Victoriana Bretadillo and had three children, Manuela, Doroteo and Francisca. Word for a hen turkey, it is said his nickname stands for his freckled face (similar to that of a turkey egg) or his laughter resembling the bird's peculiar gargle.

Pípila was a miner. He came from the nearby town of San Miguel, now San Miguel de Allende, and worked in the Mellado mine. (The Rayas and Mellado mines were the first in Guanajuato, opened in 1558). Miners are of great importance in the state and city of Guanajuato, which was the largest exporter of silver in the world at the end of the 18th century. Silver and other minerals are still mined there today.

Pípila, became famous for an act of heroism near the very beginning of the Mexican War of Independence, on 28 September 1810. The insurrection had begun in the nearby town of Dolores, led by Miguel Hidalgo, a criollo priest born in Pénjamo. He soon moved to the city of Guanajuato, Guanajuato, where the Spanish barricaded themselves–along with plenty of silver and other riches–in a grain warehouse known as the Alhóndiga de Granaditas. The granary was a stone fortress with high stone walls, but its wooden door proved to be a shortcoming.

With a long, flat stone tied to his back to protect him from the muskets of the Spanish troops, Pípila carried tar and a torch to the door of the Alhóndiga and set it on fire. The insurgents–who far outnumbered the Spanish in the warehouse–stormed inside and killed all the soldiers and the civil Spanish refugees. Some accounts say that Pípila was not alone but went accompanied by other indigenous miners ready to fight for their freedom from the Spanish, but as the story is told today in Guanajuato, Pípila stood alone to break through the door.

The monument
The stone monument of a muscular man, holding aloft a flaming torch, towers on a hill at the edge of the city. The torch that he carries is known as "the torch of liberty". Visitors can ride on a funicular to and from the monument, or they can walk up one of several steep stairways to the top. At the base of the monument, a series of broad stone plazas provides plenty of space for the numerous camera-carrying tourists and young lovers. From the foot of the monument, they have a fantastic view of the whole city of Guanajuato. This monument can be found in Cerro de San Miguel S/N, Zona Centro, 36000 Guanajuato, Gto., Mexico.

See also
 José Mariano Jiménez

References

External links
 Monument to El Pípila

El Pípila at the door of the Alhóndiga (Museo del Caracol, Mexico City)

1782 births
1863 deaths
1810 in New Spain
People from San Miguel de Allende
People of the Mexican War of Independence